Joonas Jääskeläinen (born July 14, 1973) is a Finnish former professional ice hockey winger.

Career statistics

External links

Living people
Espoo Blues players
Lahti Pelicans players
1973 births
Finnish ice hockey right wingers
Ice hockey people from Helsinki